The 2019 BYU Cougars baseball team represents Brigham Young University in the 2019 NCAA Division I baseball season.  Mike Littlewood acts in his seventh season as head coach of the Cougars. After being picked to finish first in the conference in 2018, BYU suffered through a season with many injuries on both sides of play. The end result was a 22–28 season with BYU finishing tied with Pacific at 11–17 for ninth place in conference play. The result led Littlewood to clean house in the off-season, and BYU enters 2019 with 20 new players on the roster: 17 newcomers and 3 returning missionaries. The Cougars were picked to finish sixth in the WCC Pre-season poll.

2019 roster

Schedule 

! style="background:#FFFFFF;color:#002654;"| Regular Season
|- 

|- bgcolor="#ccffcc"
| February 15 || vs. Northwestern || – || Sloan Park  || Facebook || 4–3 (10) || Jarod Lessar (1–0) || Josh Levy (0–1) || None || 333 || 1–0 || –
|- align="center" bgcolor="ffbbb"
| February 16 || vs. Northwestern || – || Sloan Park || Facebook || 2–3 || Sam Lawrence (1–0) || Justin Sterner (0–1) || None || 333 || 1–1 || –
|- bgcolor="#ccffcc"
| February 16 || vs. Northwestern || – || Sloan Park  || Facebook || 11–2 ||  || Ryan Bader (0–1) || None || 333 || 2–1 || –
|- align="center" bgcolor="ffbbb"
| February 18 || vs. Cal || – || Tempe Diablo Stadium  || Facebook || 6–10 || Jack Delmore (1–0) || Ben Weese (0–1) ||  || N/A || 2–2 || –
|- bgcolor="#ccffcc"
| February 21 ||  || – || Whataburger Field  || Team 1 Sports || 6–2 ||  Reid McLaughlin (1–0) || Cody LeCompte (0–1) || None || 625 || 3–2 || –
|- bgcolor="#ccffcc"
| February 22 || vs. Ohio State || – || Whataburger Field  || Team 1 Sports || 5–1 || Jordan Wood (1–0)  || Seth Lonsway (1–1) || None || 309 || 4–2 || –
|- bgcolor="#ccffcc"
| February 23 || vs. Oral Roberts || – || Whataburger Field  || Team 1 Sports || 8–3 || Justin Sterner (1–1)  || Landon Odom (0–1) || None || 1,375 || 5–2 || –
|- bgcolor="#ccffcc"
| February 28 || at Lamar || – || Vincent-Beck Stadium  || Facebook || 4–2 (10) || Reid McLaughlin (2–0) || Ryan Erickson (0–1) ||  || 417 || 6–2 || –
|-

|- align="center" bgcolor="ffbbb"
| March 1 || at Lamar || – || Vincent-Beck Stadium  || Facebook || 1–3 || Jason Blanchard (2–1) || Jarod Lessar (1–1) || AJ Ozorio-Brace (1) || 1,091 || 6–3 || –
|- bgcolor="#ccffcc"
| March 2 || at Lamar || – || Vincent-Beck Stadium  || Facebook || 4–0 || Justin Sterner (2–1) || Noah Sills (0–1) || None || 712 || 7–3 || –
|- bgcolor="#ccffcc"
| March 5 || Utah Valley || – || Larry H. Miller Field  || TheW.tv || 5–1 || Reid McLaughlin (3–0) || Spenser Triplett (0–1) || None || 958 || 8–3 || –
|- bgcolor="#ccffcc"
| March 7 || Milwaukee || – || Larry H. Miller Field  || TheW.tv || 11–8 || Jordan Wood (2–0) || Jared Reklaitis (1–3) || None || 985 || 9–3 || –
|- bgcolor="#ccffcc"
| March 8 || Milwaukee || – || Larry H. Miller Field  || TheW.tv || 14–6 (5) || Jarod Lessar (2–1) || Elijah Goodman (0–1) || None || 643 || 10–3 || –
|- bgcolor="#CCCCCC"
| March 8 || Milwaukee || – || Larry H. Miller Field || TheW.tv || colspan=7| Cancelled- Snow
|- bgcolor="#ccffcc"
| March 9 || Milwaukee || – || Larry H. Miller Field  || TheW.tv || 5–3 || Justin Sterner (3–1) || Mike Edwards (2–1) || Reid McLaughlin (1) || 989 || 11–3 || –
|- bgcolor="#ccffcc"
|March 12 || Niagara || – || Larry H. Miller Field || TheW.tv || 11–5 || Mitch McIntyre (1–0) || Jackson Jones (0–1) || None || 247 || 12–3 || –
|- align="center" bgcolor="ffbbb"
|March 14 || Gonzaga* || – || Larry H. Miller Field || TheW.tv || 2–4 (11) || Alek Jacob (2–2) || Blake Inouye (0–1) || None || 913 || 12–4 || 0–1
|- bgcolor="#ccffcc"
|March 15 || Gonzaga* || – || Larry H. Miller Field || TheW.tv || 7–4 || Easton Walker (1–0) || Justin Blatner (1–2) ||  || 965 || 13–4 || 1–1
|- align="center" bgcolor="ffbbb"
|March 16 || Gonzaga* || – || Larry H. Miller Field || TheW.tv || 2–4 || Mac Lardner (1–3) || Justin Sterner (3–2) || Alek Jacob (5) || 1,447 || 13–5 || 1–2
|- bgcolor="#ccffcc"
| March 19 || at Utah Valley || – || UCCU Ballpark  || WAC DN ||  || Mitch McIntyre (2–0) ||  Jesse Schmit (2–2) || None || 1,068 || 14–5 || –
|- bgcolor="#ccffcc"
| March 21 || Portland* || – || Larry H. Miller Field  || TheW.tv || 10–1 || Jordan Wood (3–0) || Kevin Baker (0–2) || None || 872 || 15–5 || 2–2
|- bgcolor="#ccffcc"
| March 22 || Portland* || – || Larry H. Miller Field  || Stadium on Livestream || 3–1 || Easton Walker (2–0) || Eli Morse (2–2) ||  || 867 || 16–5 || 3–2
|- bgcolor="#ccffcc"
| March 23 || Portland* || – || Larry H. Miller Field  || BYUtv || 11–1 || Justin Sterner (4–2) || Nate Packard (2–1) || None || 1,343 || 17–5 || 4–2
|- bgcolor="#ccffcc"
| March 26 || Oregon || – || Larry H. Miller Field  || BYUtv.org || 7–3 || Reid McLaughlin (4–0) || Nico Tellache (3–2) || None || 1,594 || 18–5 || –
|- bgcolor="#ccffcc"
| March 28 || Saint Mary's* || – || Larry H. Miller Field  || BYUtv.org || 10–6 || Jordan Wood (4–0) || Kevin Milam (3–3)  || Reid McLaughlin (2) || 1,358 || 19–5 || 5–2
|- bgcolor="#ccffcc"
| March 29 || Saint Mary's* || – || Larry H. Miller Field  || TheW.tv || 11–0 || Easton Walker (3–0) || Ken Waldichuk (3–2) || None || 789 || 20–5 || 6–2
|- bgcolor="#ccffcc"
| March 30 || Saint Mary's* || – || Larry H. Miller Field  || BYUtv || 5–3 || Justin Sterner (5–2) ||  Carlos Lomeli (4–2)|| None || 1,532 || 21–5 || 7–2
|-

|- align="center" bgcolor="ffbbb"
| April 2 || at Utah || #24 || Smith's Ballpark  || P12 || 6–8 || Jacob Rebar (1–0) ||  || Zac McCleve (1) || 1,814 || 21–6 || –
|- align="center" bgcolor="ffbbb"
| April 4 || at San Diego* || #24 || Fowler Park  || TheW.tv || 5–15 || Chris Murphy (4–1) || Jordan Wood (4–1) || None || 592 || 21–7  || 7–3
|- align="center" bgcolor="ffbbb"
| April 5 || at San Diego* || #24 || Fowler Park  || TheW.tv || 5–6 (10) || Grady Miller (3–2) || Mitch McIntyre (2–1) || None || 625 || 21–8 || 7–4
|- bgcolor="#ccffcc"
| April 6 || at San Diego* || #24 || Fowler Park  || TheW.tv || 17–4 || Justin Sterner (6–2) || Jack Dolak (3–3) || Blake Inouye (1) || 385 || 22–8 || 8–4
|- bgcolor="#CCCCCC"
| April 9 || Utah || – || Larry H. Miller Field || BYUtv.org ||  colspan=7| Cancelled- Rain
|- bgcolor="#ccffcc"
| April 11 || Pepperdine* || – || Larry H. Miller Field || BYUtv.org || 13–7 || Reid McLaughlin (5–0) || Christian Stoutland (1–3) || None || 991 || 23–8 || 9–4
|- bgcolor="#ccffcc"
| April 12 || Pepperdine* || – || Larry H. Miller Field || TheW.tv || 4–2 || Easton Walker (4–0) || Easton Lucas (3–3) ||  || 2,470 || 24–8 || 10–4
|- align="center" bgcolor="ffbbb"
| April 13 || Pepperdine* || – || Larry H. Miller Field || BYUtv || 0–7 || Jonathan Pendergast (4–2)  || Justin Sterner (6–3) || None || 1,612 || 24–9 || 10–5
|- align="center" bgcolor="ffbbb"
| April 18 || at Washington || – || Husky Ballpark || P12+ UW || 0–1 || Chris Micheles (3–1) || Reid McLaughlin (5–1) || Stevie Emenuels (2) || 387 || 24–10 || –
|- bgcolor="#ccffcc"
| April 19 || at Washington || – || Husky Ballpark || P12+ UW || 7–3 || Easton Walker (5–0) || Josh Burgmann (3–3) || None || 554 || 25–10 || –
|- bgcolor="#ccffcc"
| April 20 || at Washington || – || Husky Ballpark || P12+ UW || 4–0 || Justin Sterner (7–3) || Chris Micheles (3–2) || Reid McLaughlin (3) || 744 || 26–10 || –
|- bgcolor="#ccffcc"
| April 25 || at Pacific* || #29 || Klein Family Field  || TheW.tv || 11–7 (10) || Mitch McIntyre (3–1) || Nic Swanson (1–1)  || None || 238 || 27–10 || 11–5
|- bgcolor="#ccffcc"
| April 26 || at Pacific* || #29 || Klein Family Field  || TheW.tv || 12–1 || Easton Walker (6–0) || Hayden Pearce (2–1) || None || 365 || 28–10 || 12–5
|- bgcolor="#ccffcc"
| April 27 || at Pacific* || #29 || Klein Family Field  || TheW.tv || 5–0 || Justin Sterner (8–3) || Ryan Shreve (4–4) || None || 352 || 29–10 || 13–5
|- align="center" bgcolor="ffbbb"
| April 29 || at Cal || #27 || Evans Diamond  || P12 || 2–3 || Rogelio Reyes (4–1) ||  || Arman Sabouri (4) || 244 || 29–11 || –
|-

|- align="center" bgcolor="ffbbb"
| May 2 ||  || #27 || George C. Page Stadium  || TheW.tv || 1–5 || Codie Pavia (4–2) || Jordan Wood (4–2) || Nick Frasso (6) || 388 || 29–12 || 13–6
|- bgcolor="#ccffcc"
| May 3 ||  || #27 || George C. Page Stadium  || TheW.tv || 8–5 || Jarod Lessar (3–1) || Josh Agnew (4–4) || Blake Inouye (2) || 581 || 30–12 || 14–6
|- bgcolor="#ccffcc"
| May 4 ||  || #27 || George C. Page Stadium  || TheW.tv || 10–3 || Blake Inouye (1–1) || Matt Voelker (1–4) || None || 470 || 31–12 || 15–6  
|- align="center" bgcolor="ffbbb"
| May 6 ||  || #30 || Tony Gwynn Stadium  ||  || 5–10 || Daniel Ritcheson (2–1) || Jarod Lessar (3–2) || None || 101 || 31–13 || –
|- bgcolor="#ccffcc"
| May 9 || San Francisco* || #30 || Larry H. Miller Field  || BYUtv.org || 20–3 || Jordan Wood (5–2) || Riley Ornido (6–6) || None || 1,554 || 32–13 || 16–6
|- align="center" bgcolor="ffbbb"
| May 10 || San Francisco* || #30 || Larry H. Miller Field  || BYUtv || 1–9 || Scott Parker (7–3) || Easton Walker (6–1) || Alex Pham (6) || 3,189 || 32–14 || 16–7
|- bgcolor="#ccffcc"
| May 11 || San Francisco* || #30 || Larry H. Miller Field  || BYUtv || 17–9 || Blake Inouye (2–1) || Julian Washburn (8–2) || None || 2,337 || 33–14 || 17–7
|- bgcolor="#ccffcc"
| May 14 || at Utah || #30 || Smith's Ballpark  || P12 || 10–3 || Reid McLaughlin (6–1) || Zac McCleve (1–5) || None || 4,011 || 34–14 || –
|- align="center" bgcolor="ffbbb"
|May 16 || at Santa Clara* || #30 || Stephen Schott Stadium || TheW.tv || 2–4 || Russell Grant II (3–4) || Jordan Wood (5–3) || Eric Lex (4) || 415 || 34–15  || 17–8
|- bgcolor="#ccffcc"
|May 17 || at Santa Clara* || #30 || Stephen Schott Stadium || TheW.tv || 7–5 || Easton Walker (7–1) || Holden Bernhardt (1–7) || None || 531 || 35–15 || 18–8
|- bgcolor="#ccffcc"
|May 18 || at Santa Clara* || #30 || Stephen Schott Stadium || TheW.tv || 2–1 || Reid McLaughlin (7–1) || Eric Lex (0–1) || None || 395 || 36–15 || 19–8
|-

|-
! style="background:#FFFFFF;color:#002654;"| 2019 West Coast Conference baseball tournament
|- 

|- align="center" 
|May 23 ||  || #30 || Banner Island Ballpark || TheW.tv ||  ||  ||  ||  ||  ||  || –
|- align="center" 
|May 24 ||  || #30 || Banner Island Ballpark || TheW.tv ||  ||  ||  ||  ||  ||  || –
|-

|- 
| style="font-size:88%"|Rankings from Collegiate Baseball. Parenthesis indicate tournament seedings.
|- 
| style="font-size:88%"| *West Coast Conference games

The BYU/Gonzaga series was originally scheduled to take place in Spokane, but it was moved to Provo due to the weather.
The BYU/San Diego State game was originally scheduled to take place at Lake Elsinore Diamond but was moved to Tony Gwynn Stadium.
After splitting the series with Utah, BYU was awarded the Deseret First Duel trophy via run differential.

Rivalries
BYU has two main rivalries on their schedule- the Deseret First Duel vs. Utah and the UCCU Crosstown Clash vs. Utah Valley. The Cougars will also participate in the Kleberg Bank College Classic.

Radio Information
For the second consecutive season BYU Baseball will be broadcast as part of the NuSkin BYU Sports Network, and for the first time ever every BYU Baseball game will be broadcast on radio. Brent Norton returns to provide play-by-play for his 27th consecutive season, with Jason Shepherd or Greg Wrubell subbing in when Brent is unavailable. Tuckett Slade will provide analysis for most games, but a small selection of former players will also be used. Games will once again be carried on KOVO and BYU Radio. KOVO will have five exclusives (Gm. 1 Feb. 16, Mar. 8, Mar. 12, Mar. 23, and Apr. 6), BYU Radio's KUMT will have one exclusive (Feb. 21), and BYU Radio will carry three others exclusively across all their stations (Gm. 2 Feb. 16, Mar. 7, and Mar. 19).  The Mar. 5 game will have hour one only on KOVO before BYU Radio JIP's the game at 7 PM MST. All other games will air on both KOVO and BYU Radio.

TV Announcers
Feb 15: Jason Shepherd & Tuckett Slade
Feb 16 (1): Jason Shepherd & Tuckett Slade
Feb 16 (2): Jason Shepherd & Mason Marshall
Feb 18: Jason Shepherd & Tuckett Slade
Feb 21: Chad Keys
Feb 22: Chad Keys
Feb 23: Chad Keys
Feb 26: Harold Mann
Mar 1: Harold Mann
Mar 2: No commentary
Mar 5: Jason Shepherd & Tuckett Slade
Mar 7: Greg Wrubell & Tuckett Slade
Mar 8: Jason Shepherd & Tuckett Slade
Mar 9: Jason Shepherd & Tuckett Slade
Mar 12: Brent Norton & Tuckett Slade
Mar 14: Brent Norton & Tuckett Slade
Mar 15: Brent Norton & Tuckett Slade
Mar 16: Brent Norton & Tuckett Slade
Mar 19: Jordan Bianucci & Ryan Pickens
Mar 21: Brent Norton & Tuckett Slade
Mar 22: Brent Norton & Tuckett Slade
Mar 23: Jarom Jordan & Gary Sheide
Mar 26: Spencer Linton, Gary Sheide, & Jason Shepherd
Mar 28: Spencer Linton, Gary Sheide, & Jason Shepherd
Mar 29: Brent Norton & Tuckett Slade
Mar 30: Spencer Linton, Gary Sheide, & Jason Shepherd
Apr 2: J.B. Long & Javy López
Apr 4: Jack Murray & John "JC" Cunningham
Apr 5: Steve Quis, Alex Jensen, & Sammy O'Brien
Apr 6: Jack Murray & John Cunningham
Apr 11: Spencer Linton, Gary Sheide, & Jason Shepherd
Apr 12: Greg Wrubell & Tuckett Slade
Apr 13: Spencer Linton, Gary Sheide, & Jason Shepherd
Apr 18: Bill Abelson
Apr 19: Bill Abelson
Apr 20: Bill Abelson
Apr 25: Ben Ross
Apr 26: Jeff Dominick
Apr 27: Jeff Dominick
Apr 29: Roxy Bernstein & Dean Stotz
May 2: Chris Turkmany
May 3: Sam Farber, Keith Benjamin, & Sammy O'Brien
May 4: Chris Turkmany & Jim Collins
May 9: Spencer Linton, Gary Sheide, & Jason Shepherd
May 10: Spencer Linton, Gary Sheide, & Jason Shepherd
May 11: Dave McCann, Gary Sheide, & Jason Shepherd
May 14: J.B. Long & Dean Stotz
May 16: David Gentile
May 17: David Gentile
May 18: David Gentile
May 23: Steve Quis, Alex Jensen, & Sammy O'Brien
May 24: Steve Quis, Alex Jensen, & Sammy O'Brien

References 

2019 West Coast Conference baseball season
2019 team
2019 in sports in Utah